Garam Khoon is a 1980 Hindi-language action film. Produced and written by Tej Nath Zar and directed by A. Salam. The film stars Vinod Khanna, Sulakshana Pandit, Bindu in lead roles and Ajit as main protagonist. The film's music is by Shankar Jaikishan

Plot

Sood Saheb (Nazir Hussain) is a rich & reputed industrialist in the city. He has a beautiful wife (Sulochana) and two twin sons, Babloo & Ravi (Vinod Khanna in double role). Vishal (Ajit) is the manager in Sood Industries. He is very cunning person. He secretly works for the underworld don, Rajan Seth. One day he is caught red handed and got fired by Sood Saheb immediately. Vishal kidnaps Sood's twin son (Babloo) to seek revenge. Babloo grows up and becomes a criminal who works for Vishal. Ravi takes care of her father's business. Ravi loves Rama and engages with her. Ramesh sends Babloo to Ravi's place to take over all the business and property.
Will both brothers be able to recognize each other? 
Will the whole family be together? 
Will Vishal get punishment for his bad deeds?

Cast
Vinod Khanna as Ravi Sood / Babloo aka Johny(double role)
Sulakshana Pandit as Rama
Nazir Hussain as Sood Saheb
Sulochana as Mrs. Sood
Ajit as Vishal	
Rajan Haksar as Rajan Seth (Underworld Don)
K.N. Singh as Police Commissioner Singh
Bindu as Pummy
Imtiaz as Gullu (Vishal's Son)
Satish Kaul as Inspector (Rama's Brother)	
Shashi Puri as Dancer in Pardesiya Song
Keshto Mukherjee as Bajrang (Peon in Ravi's Office)
Helen as Dancer in Paina Loopi song.
Dhumal as Sadashiv
Brahamchari as Shersingh (Bajrang's friend)
Ganja Shetty as Swami 
Shivraj as Pandit Ji (Sood Industries's Manager)

Music

External links

References

 http://www.gomolo.com/garam-khoon-movie/5186
 http://www.hindigeetmala.net/movie/garam_khoon.htm
 http://www.ibosnetwork.com/asp/filmbodetails.asp?id=Garam+Khoon

1980 films
1980s Hindi-language films
Films scored by Shankar–Jaikishan